Pentagon is a 1986 political novel by Allen Drury which follows the American military bureaucracy as it reacts to a crisis with the Soviet Union. It is a standalone work set in a different fictional timeline from Drury's 1959 novel Advise and Consent, which earned him a Pulitzer Prize for Fiction.

The novel was published in the United Kingdom as The Destiny Makers in 1988.

Plot summary
The Soviet Union invades and occupies a sparsely-populated Pacific atoll and proceeds to kill the inhabitants and gradually construct a missile and submarine base. Diplomatic overtures by the United States accomplish nothing, and a military response to this Soviet threat seems necessary. Such plans, however, are frustrated by infighting within the Pentagon, Congress, and elsewhere in the government. When the novel ends, the U.S. has failed to respond and the Soviets have consolidated their hold on the atoll.

Critical reception

Publishers Weekly called the idea behind the novel "promising" but then noted "the book's merit ends with that concept". The review went on to criticize it as a "bloated, wooden novel that lacks the simplest of narrative virtues" and added, "as the Pentagon's mishandling of this crisis reaches near-buffoonery, Drury's attempted critique of a bureaucracy burdened with political infighting, waste and mismanagement unintentionally becomes almost comic for those readers with the endurance to get that far."

Diane D. Henderson of The Washington Monthly called the novel "a big, sprawling work ... [that] never quite achieves coherence or focus". She writes:

The novel was released by Severn House Publishers in the United Kingdom as The Destiny Makers in August 1988.

References

External links
 

1986 American novels
American political novels
Doubleday (publisher) books
Novels by Allen Drury
Novels set on islands